Friedrich Körner (24 January 1921 – 3 September 1998) was a World War II Luftwaffe Flying ace. He was also a recipient of the Knight's Cross of the Iron Cross. The Knight's Cross of the Iron Cross was awarded to recognise extreme battlefield bravery or successful military leadership. Körner was credited with 36 victories in over 250 missions. All of his victories were scored whilst flying the Messerschmitt Bf 109.

Military career
Körner joined the Luftwaffe on 15 November 1939 and after completion of his pilot training joined I. Gruppe of Jagdgeschwader 27 (JG 27—27th Fighter Wing) in North Africa on 4 July 1941. Körner claimed his first victory on 12 October 1941 near Sallum. In June 1942 he scored 20 kills, five on the 26 June making him an "ace-in-a-day", Körner's most successful day. On 4 July 1942, a year to the day of his arrival, he was shot down whilst scrambling to intercept a Royal Air Force (RAF) bomber formation over the front line near El Alamein in his Bf 109 F-4/Trop (Werknummer 8696—factory number) "Red 11". His victor was Lieutenant Lawrence Waugh of 1 Squadron SAAF. Körner was captured and sent to a prisoner of war camp in Canada, and released in 1947.

After the war
Körner joined the West German Air Force in 1955. He retired from military service on 30 June 1979, having reached the rank of Brigadegeneral. Körner lived in Paris until his death on 3 September 1998.

Summary of career

Aerial victory claims
Körner was credited with 36 aerial victories claimed in approximately 250 combat missions, all of which over North Africa. Mathews and Foreman, authors of Luftwaffe Aces — Biographies and Victory Claims, researched the German Federal Archives and found records for 36 aerial victory claims, all of which over North Africa.

Awards
 Iron Cross (1939) 2nd and 1st Class
 German Cross in Gold on 21 August 1942 as Leutnant in the I./Jagdgeschwader 27
 Knight's Cross of the Iron Cross on 6 September 1942 as Leutnant and Staffelführer of the 2./Jagdgeschwader 27

Notes

References

Citations

Bibliography

 
 
 
 
 
 
 
 
 
 
 
 
 

1921 births
1998 deaths
Luftwaffe pilots
People from Schwerte
People from the Province of Westphalia
German World War II flying aces
Recipients of the Gold German Cross
Recipients of the Knight's Cross of the Iron Cross
Bundeswehr generals
Brigadier generals of the German Air Force
Military personnel from North Rhine-Westphalia